A number of steamships have carried the name Saxon Prince, including:

 , in service 1884–95, later Giltra
 , in service 1899–1916

Ship names